Shahrak-e Halab (also Romanized as Shahrak-e Ḩalab; also known as Ḩalab-e ‘Olyā) is a village in Anguran Rural District, Anguran District, Mahneshan County, Zanjan Province, Iran. At the 2006 census, its population was 551, in 112 families.

References 

Populated places in Mahneshan County